The Governor is a 2009 Turkish action film, directed by M. Çağatay Tosun, about the idealist governor of the Aegean city of Denizli, where a team of engineers from the Turkish Mining Exploration Institute (MTA) have recently discovered reserves of uranium.

Production
The film was shot on location in Istanbul, Ankara and Uşak, Turkey.

Synopsis
Faruk Yazıcı (Erdal Beşikçioğlu) is the idealist governor of the Aegean city of Denizli, where a team of engineers from the Turkish Mining Exploration Institute (MTA) have recently discovered reserves of uranium.

The governor joins forces with his childhood friend Ömer Uçar (Uğur Polat), who heads the team of MTA engineers, in a fight against the beautiful and scheming bureaucrat Ceyda Aydın (Şebnem Dönmez), who actually works to get mines in Turkey under the control of foreign companies. A number of unexplained murders are uncovered only a short while after the governor and the MTA engineers focus on the reserves in Denizli.

Release
It was later released across Germany, Austria and the UK.

Box office
The film opened at number one at the Turkish box office and was the ninth highest grossing Turkish film of 2009 with a worldwide total gross of US$2,339,823. That figure has subsequently risen to US$2,371,977.

See also 
 2009 in film
 Turkish films of 2009

References

External links
 
 
 

2009 films
2000s Turkish-language films
2009 action films
Films set in Turkey
Turkish action films
Films shot in Ankara